The United States Astronaut Badge is a badge of the United States, awarded to military  and civilian personnel who have completed training and performed a successful spaceflight. A variation of the astronaut badge is also issued to civilians who are employed with the National Aeronautics and Space Administration as specialists on spaceflight missions. It is the least-awarded qualification badge of the United States military.

Eligibility
The U.S. Army has awarded the badge to officers that have orbited the Earth. Seven USAF and NASA pilots qualified for the astronaut badge by flying the suborbital X-15 rocket spaceplane. American test pilots Michael Melvill and Brian Binnie were each awarded a commercial astronaut badge by the Federal Aviation Administration (FAA) when they flew sub-orbital missions aboard the Scaled Composites SpaceShipOne rocket spaceplane. All others who have been awarded the astronaut badge earned it travelling to space in non-winged rockets, the X-15, or the Space Shuttle. Three of the crew members aboard the Ax-1 flight aboard the Crew Dragon Capsule were awarded their civilian astronaut wings by their Mission commander upon becoming the first private citizens to travel to the International Space Station on April 9, 2022.

Military badges
Each of the military services issues its own version of the astronaut badge, which consists of a standard aviation badge with an astronaut device (shooting star through a halo) centered on the badge's shield, or escutcheon. The United States Air Force and United States Army astronaut badges are issued in three degrees: Basic, senior, and command (Air Force)/master (Army). The senior astronaut badge is denoted by a star centered above the decoration, while the command/master level is indicated by a star and wreath.

U.S. Air Force astronauts

The U.S. Air Force Astronaut Badge consists of a standard USAF aeronautical badge upon which is centered the Astronaut Device. The Air Force does not consider Astronaut to be a separate rating from its six established rating badges, but as a "qualifier" to them, and may only be awarded by the Air Force Chief of Staff after written application upon completion of an operational space mission. The rating of Observer is used for USAF Mission Specialists who have completed training but not a mission and are not otherwise aeronautically rated as a USAF pilot, RPA pilot, combat systems officer, air battle manager, or flight surgeon. In 2007, the U.S. Air Force announced the opening of astronaut mission specialists positions to enlisted personnel who met certain eligibility requirements.  These requirements include: 
 Be on active duty in the U.S. Air Force
 Be a United States citizen
 Have a minimum of a bachelor's degree in either engineering, mathematics, biological science, or physical science, with 3 years experience
 Have a current Class II Flight Physical
 Be between 62 and 75 inches tall
No enlisted astronaut badges are yet known to have been issued.

U.S. Army astronauts

The gold astronaut device is issued by the U.S. Army to Army aviators, flight surgeons, and aircrew members that qualify as astronauts. The astronaut device is a gold shooting star and elliptical orbit which is affixed over the shield of previously awarded Army aviation badges. Army astronauts that have yet to fly a mission and have not previously been awarded any aviation badge are awarded the army aviation badge. Once they have flown a mission, they are awarded the Astronaut Device which is affixed to the shield of their army aviation badge. The army astronaut device was approved on May 17, 1983. The black version of the device and its sew-on equivalent may be worn on the Army Combat Uniform (ACU); the silver wings with gold device version is authorized for wear on Army Service Uniforms. It is believed to be the rarest badge issued by the U.S. Army.

U.S. Navy, Marine Corps, and Coast Guard astronauts
The naval astronaut insignias are issued in a single degree to naval aviators and flight officers from the United States Navy, United States Marine Corps, and United States Coast Guard, with officers of all three branches receiving their designations as aviators or flight officers through the naval aviation flight training program. All three branches also wear the same insignia which consists of naval aviator insignia or naval flight officer insignia with a centered gold astronaut device. However, the Coast Guard only issues the naval aviator version of the astronaut insignia to its astronauts.

NASA astronaut pins

In addition to the astronaut badge, which is worn on a military uniform, an astronaut pin is also issued to all NASA astronauts, signifying their eligibility to take part in missions to space. These include flights to the International Space Station, and Artemis missions to the moon. 

It is a lapel pin worn on civilian clothing. The pin is issued in two grades, silver and gold, with the silver pin awarded to candidates who have successfully completed astronaut training and the gold pin to astronauts who have flown in space. Astronaut candidates are given the silver pin but are required to purchase the gold pin at a cost of approximately $400. Astronauts aboard the Mercury 7 were the first to receive the pins.

A unique astronaut pin was made for NASA astronaut Deke Slayton in 1967. It was gold in color, like the ones given to astronauts who had flown, and it had a small diamond embedded in the star. It was made at the request of the crew of the first crewed mission of the Apollo program as a tribute to Slayton's work at NASA. The idea was that everyone in the Astronaut Office had thought Slayton would never get to fly in space (due to his paroxysmal atrial fibrillation; he would later fly on board the Apollo-Soyuz Test Project as docking module pilot), however as they knew it was primarily because of him that they managed to do so, he should wear a gold pin rather than a silver one as a token of appreciation. As they knew Slayton would refuse to wear exactly the same gold pin as veteran astronauts, the diamond was added. The pin was supposed to have been flown on board the Apollo 1 spacecraft, then given to Slayton after the mission was over. However, the Apollo 1 crew died in a fire during a training exercise on January 27, 1967. The pin was given to Slayton by the three widows of the dead crew as a token of condolence. This diamond-studded gold pin was later flown to the Moon on board Apollo 11 in July 1969.

One silver astronaut pin currently rests on the surface of the Moon, the one that belonged to Clifton Williams, left there by astronaut Alan Bean during Apollo 12 in 1969. Williams was originally scheduled to fly to the Moon as Lunar Module Pilot on Apollo 12 but was killed in a plane crash before he was officially assigned to the flight. Bean was his replacement.

NASA and FAA civilian badges
NASA has a civilian astronaut badge, which is issued to civilian personnel who participate in U.S. space missions.

The U.S. Federal Aviation Administration also grants commercial astronaut wings to commercial pilots who have performed a successful spaceflight. Two people earned Commercial Wings in 2004, and two other crews have been granted wings since 2018. The FAA Commercial Astronaut Wings design changed before the 2018 flights.

NASA Space Shuttle payload specialist badges 

A unique badge was created for individuals serving as payload specialists on NASA Space Shuttle missions. Payload specialists were selected by a variety of organizations and included:
 individuals selected by the research community, a company or consortium flying a commercial payload aboard the spacecraft
 non-NASA astronauts selected by partner nations
 U.S. legislative branch representatives

The payload specialist badge of Ukrainian astronaut Leonid Kadenyuk

See also
 Military badges of the United States
 Badges of the United States Air Force
 Badges of the United States Army
 Badges of the United States Coast Guard
 Badges of the United States Marine Corps
 Badges of the United States Navy
 Human spaceflight
 Mission patch
 Edge of space
 Pilot-Cosmonaut of the Russian Federation

References 

United States military badges
Space program of the United States